Alexander McVeigh Miller House, also known as the Mittie Clark Miller House and "The Cedars," is a historic home located at Alderson, Greenbrier County, West Virginia. It was built starting in 1881, and is a large, "T"-shaped frame dwelling.  It features three-bay verandas and a full height, pedimented,
two-columned portico.  It was the home of successful novelist Mittie Frances Clarke Point and her husband Alexander McVeigh Miller.  In 1939, Ruth Bryan Owen (1885-1954) and her husband purchased "The Cedars" and began making repairs.  They sold the property in 1945.

It was listed on the National Register of Historic Places in 1978.

References

Houses on the National Register of Historic Places in West Virginia
Houses in Greenbrier County, West Virginia
Houses completed in 1881
National Register of Historic Places in Greenbrier County, West Virginia
William Jennings Bryan family
1881 establishments in West Virginia